Baquerizo may refer to:

People
Alfredo Baquerizo (1859–1951), Ecuadorian politician
Elsa Baquerizo (born 1987), Spanish beach volleyball player

Places
Alfredo Baquerizo Moreno Canton, a canton in Guayas province in Ecuador
Alfredo Baquerizo Moreno (town), a town in Guayas province in Ecuador
Puerto Baquerizo Moreno, capital of Galápagos Province, Ecuador